Takhtisdziri Achaemenid seal refers to an Achaemenid seal which was excavated by I. Gagoshidze in 1996 in the village of Takhtisdziri in Shida Kartli, Kareli Municipality in Georgia. It is a conical dark sky-blue (approaching violet) seal made out of chalcedony. The seal, which has a outward swelling surface, depicts a Tree of Life in addition to a pair of wild goats on both sides of the tree. A four-petalled flower is depicted at each branch of the tree. It dates to the earlier half of the 5th century BC. According to Ketevan Dzhavakhishvili in Ancient Civilizations from Scythia to Siberia, the seal, on the whole, is a genuine masterpiece. The seal belongs to the "Oriental Royal Stye" as defined by John Boardman, which represents cylinder and conical seals predominantly influenced by Assyrian and Babylonian elements.

References

Archaeology of the Achaemenid Empire
1996 in Georgia (country)
Archaeology of Georgia (country)
Shida Kartli
Cylinder and impression seals in archaeology
1996 archaeological discoveries